State Route 1002 (SR 1002), locally known as Tilghman Street and Union Boulevard, is a major  long east–west road in the Lehigh Valley area of the U.S. state of Pennsylvania. The majority of the roadway is the former alignment of U.S. Route 22, maintained by the Pennsylvania Department of Transportation as a Quadrant Route, and is not signed except on small white segment markers.

Tilghman Street begins at Pennsylvania Route 100 in Fogelsville, though SR 1002 continues west on Main Street (also old US 22) to the intersection of Church Street (SR 3014). It becomes Union Boulevard just east of the bridge over the Lehigh River in Allentown; SR 1002 ends at the interchange with Pennsylvania Route 378 in Bethlehem. Union Boulevard continues over Monocacy Creek, which forms the border between Lehigh and Northampton Counties, and ends in downtown Bethlehem.

The highway attracts more than the average traffic for roads in the Lehigh Valley. An average of 21,018 vehicles use it in South Whitehall Township and 21,706 in Allentown each day.

History
When the state began taking over state highways through the Sproul Road Bill, signed May 31, 1911, this system did not include the direct Allentown-Harrisburg route that Interstate 78 and the parallel Tilghman Street now form part of. The main route to Harrisburg, which would soon become the William Penn Highway, left Allentown further south, on Hamilton Boulevard, now Pennsylvania Route 222, and U.S. Route 222); the portion near Allentown was Legislative Route 157 (LR 157). Another route west from Allentown (LR 163, later U.S. Route 309) ran northwest from Allentown via Walbert Avenue to Schnecksville. Travelers could continue via New Tripoli to Lenhartsville, and then along a route approximating the present I-78 to Harrisburg. From Allentown east to downtown Bethlehem, LR 159 used Hanover Avenue and Broad Street. No state highways existed within the city limits of Allentown.

The William Penn Highway was organized as an alternative to the Lincoln Highway being parallel to the Pennsylvania Railroad west of Harrisburg. The route's New York Extension, adopted in 1916, passed through Allentown. The state assigned the Pennsylvania Route 3 designation to this road in 1924, and in 1926 it became part of U.S. Route 22. The road west from Allentown, now College Heights Boulevard, Broadway, Tilghman Street, and Main Street, was designated LR 443 in 1925, and soon the entire shortcut between Allentown and Harrisburg was designated Pennsylvania Route 43. The New York Times was recommending use of this cutoff by early 1931 and the American Association of State Highway Officials officially moved US 22 to PA 43 on June 8, 1931. The Pennsylvania Department of Highways moved the William Penn Highway name to match. Tilghman Street and Union Boulevard (then Union Street) were once local streets in Allentown and Bethlehem, with no bridge over the Lehigh River connecting them; Allentown built that bridge in 1929.

Prior to 1931, there were no state highways in Allentown or a number of other major cities in the state. However, the state did define paths through these cities for the public; in Allentown, US 22 used Hamilton Street, and PA 43 entered on Liberty Street and turned south on 17th Street to reach Hamilton Street. The Pennsylvania General Assembly passed, on June 22, 1931, a law defining state highways through these cities and changing routes in other cities. LR 443 was defined to use College Heights Boulevard and Tilghman Street to 15th Street, where LR 157 continued along Tilghman Street and Union Boulevard to the Allentown-Bethlehem line. LR 159 was redefined to begin at the same point, continuing on Union Boulevard to Main Street in downtown Bethlehem and beyond to Easton. The newest part of Tilghman Street includes the bridge over Little Lehigh Creek in Trexler Park west of Cedar Crest Boulevard, which dates to 1936, and bypasses the older route via Broadway and College Heights Boulevard. Tilghman Street and Union Boulevard became a major long-distance traffic route, and  had eight diners as a reminder of this past importance.
 
In addition to US 22, Tilghman Street also carried U.S. Route 309 and PA Route 29 between 19th Street and Seventh Street. They were moved from Hamilton Street with US 22 in 1931, and to a freeway bypass of Allentown in the late 1950s. The Lehigh Valley Thruway, a freeway taking US 22 around Allentown and Bethlehem to the north, was opened on September 21, 1954. With the opening of these two highways, and the western extension of the Thruway in the late 1950s, no signed Traffic Routes remained on Tilghman Street and Union Boulevard, yet the road was still state maintained. It still carried LR 443, LR 157, and LR 159 through the cities, since the Thruway was assigned a new number — LR 772 — but west of the crossing at Kuhnsville, LR 443 was moved to the freeway, and the old route became LR Old 443, later LR 443 Parallel.

The road west of Church Street in Fogelsville, which was also a state highway (LR 39084), was removed from the state highway system in the late 1970s. A gap in LR 159 through downtown Bethlehem was created in 1971, at the same time as Washington Avenue and Stefko Boulevard were added to the system as a bypass, with Union Boulevard east of Pennsylvania Route 378 becoming a city street. Thus in 1987, when the new Location Referencing System was adopted, only the portion of Tilghman Street and Union Boulevard between Church Street and PA 378 was assigned a new number: State Route 1002.

In late October 2012, the Tilghman Street Bridge over the Lehigh River was repaved in order to accommodate construction vehicles for the long-awaited beginning of the American Parkway Bridge project.

Route description

Tilghman Street 

SR 1002 begins at an intersection with Church and Main Streets (State Route 3014) in Fogelsville. It then proceeds east for three-tenths of a mile (0.5 km) as Main Street to an intersection with Pennsylvania Route 100. Upon crossing SR 100, SR 1002 becomes Tilghman Street. As Tilghman Street approaches the limited-access U.S. Route 22, the road splits into two carriageways in preparation for an interchange with US 22, northeast of where US 22 separates from Interstate 78. Past the interchange with US 22, Tilghman Street returns to an undivided roadway and enters the village of Cetronia.

At an intersection with Werley Road, SR 1002 connects to Interstate 476 (the Northeast Extension of the Pennsylvania Turnpike) via a ramp leading to the toll plaza for the nearby I-476/US 22 interchange. SR 1002 continues to the southeast, passing over the turnpike. After turning to the northeast, Tilghman Street has a cloverleaf interchange with Pennsylvania Route 309. SR 1002 enters Allentown one quarter mile west of this interchange just before its intersection with 40th Street. Tilghman Street then re-enters South Whitehall for about one block as it crosses Cedar Crest Boulevard, a local north–south arterial, before entering into the city's incorporated limits for a second time.

In Allentown, Tilghman Street (SR 1002) crosses more than 30 major streets in the city. In the more populated part of the city, SR 1002 intersects the 6th and 7th street one-way couplet forming Pennsylvania Route 145. East of 4th Street, the road uses the Tilghman Street Bridge to cross Jordan Creek and American Parkway. After intersecting Front Street, SR 1002 crosses the Lehigh River on the Tilghman Street Viaduct and becomes Union Boulevard. Tilghman Street is still found in east-side Allentown, but it is not connected to SR 1002 in west-side, center city, and upper east-side Allentown.

Union Boulevard 
East of the Tilghman Street Viaduct, SR 1002 traverses numerous streets in the eastern section of Allentown. After the intersection with Fenwick Street, SR 1002 has a solid west–east routing. East of the Irving Street intersection, SR 1002 intersects Airport Road, the main road to Lehigh Valley International Airport. Briefly east of Airport Road, Union Boulevard traverses the other streets of east Allentown. SR 1002 enters the city of Bethlehem from the west as West Union Boulevard.

Approximately 1,500 feet east of the Allentown-Bethlehem boundary, Eaton Avenue is concurrent with SR 1002  for one-tenth of a mile. The route turns to the south near the junction with Pennsylvania Avenue before taking an increasingly eastern alignment. Third Avenue provides access to and from PA 378 south. SR 1002 terminates at an interchange with Pennsylvania Route 378. The highway only has access to PA 378 north. The designation continues as W. Union Boulevard upon entering the eastern sections of Bethlehem in Northampton County.

Major intersections

See also

References

External links 

Lehigh 1002
Transportation in Allentown, Pennsylvania
Transportation in Lehigh County, Pennsylvania
U.S. Route 22